David Shore (born July 3, 1959) is a Canadian television writer. Shore worked on Family Law, NYPD Blue and Due South, also producing many episodes of the latter. He created the critically acclaimed series House and more recently, Battle Creek and The Good Doctor.

Early life
Shore was born in London, Ontario, Canada, to Jewish parents. His younger twin brothers, Ephraim Shore and Raphael Shore, are Aish HaTorah rabbis. David is the only member of his family involved in television, although his younger brother Raphael Shore made three political documentaries about the Middle East conflict.

After graduating from A.B. Lucas Secondary School with distinction, he subsequently attended The University of Western Ontario for an undergraduate degree, and the University of Toronto for his law degree in 1982. Following his education he initially worked as a municipal and corporate lawyer in his native Canada before he moved to Los Angeles to break into television.

On June 20, 2018, David received an honorary degree in law from the University of Western Ontario.

Career

Television

Shore wrote for the television series Due South — about another Canadian transplanted in America, albeit a member of the Royal Canadian Mounted Police — before he became a producer on the ABC drama NYPD Blue. His work on that series was nominated for two Emmy Awards.

Shore then moved on to the series Family Law, Hack, and Century City, but these were not commercial successes.

House
In 2003, producer Paul Attanasio — who had previously worked with NBC on such shows as Homicide: Life on the Street and Gideon's Crossing — approached Shore to request a procedural, as he knew the network was looking for another one to follow up on the success of Law & Order and to imitate CBS's success with CSI and NCIS. Attanasio's idea was to apply the police procedural genre to a show about medicine. While in most procedurals the characters are secondary to the mystery, Shore decided that a medical procedural should place the mystery secondary to the hero. He therefore conceived of a hero similar to the iconic detective Sherlock Holmes.

That hero was Dr. Gregory House, the main character of House, M.D., played (with an American accent) by the British actor, comedian, and musician Hugh Laurie. Although NBC took a pass on the series, Fox picked it up, and by the end of the first season, it was their biggest new hit of 2004–05. Shore wrote or co-wrote five episodes of that first season, including its pilot and the Season One pre-finale, "Three Stories", in which he intricately wove the stories of three patients, while also revealing the reason for Dr. House's limp and Vicodin (hydrocodone) addiction. The latter of these won the 2005 Emmy for Outstanding Writing for a Drama Series. Shore made his directorial debut on the series House directing the Season Two finale "No Reason". Due to the success of House, Shore was granted a generous contract for fourth, fifth, and sixth seasons. The sixth season began with a two-hour season premiere titled "Broken", which he co-wrote. Shore and his co-writers won the Writers Guild of America Award for episodic drama at the February 2010 ceremony for the premiere.

House was renewed for a seventh season, which began airing on September 20, 2010, as well as an eighth and final season.

After House
In 2009, Shore finished production of the short-lived police TV show Winters starring Famke Janssen.

In February 2013, Entertainment Weekly reported that Shore would write for an upcoming ABC television show titled Doubt, about "a 'charming low-rent' lawyer battling his demons" starring Steve Coogan.

In August, 2015, Amazon Video released a pilot episode for Sneaky Pete, a show Shore and Bryan Cranston created. The first season of Sneaky Pete was exclusively released in its entirety on Amazon Video on January 13, 2017.

In 2019, as WGA Co-Chair, Shore joined other WGA members in firing their agents as part of the WGA's stand against the ATA and the practice of packaging. In May 2021, he and his Shore Z Productions company renewed his first look deal with Sony.

Personal life
He lived in Encino Hills, California, with his wife Judy and their three children until 2010, when the family moved to a larger home in nearby Pacific Palisades.

Filmography

Television
The numbers in directing and writing credits refer to the number of episodes.

Awards and nominations

References

External links
 "House creator David Shore and Katie Jacobs interview", media pundit, Paul William Tenny
 "More with 'House' creator David Shore", The Star-Ledger, Alan Sepinwall, August 05, 2008
"David Shore", The New York Times
"The House That Dave Built ", profile of Shore in U of T Magazine
 
 

1959 births
Living people
20th-century Canadian male writers
20th-century Canadian screenwriters
21st-century Canadian male writers
21st-century Canadian screenwriters
Screenwriters from Ontario
Canadian expatriate writers in the United States
Canadian male screenwriters
Canadian television producers
Canadian television writers
Canadian male television writers
Jewish Canadian writers
Primetime Emmy Award winners
Showrunners
University of Toronto Faculty of Law alumni
University of Western Ontario alumni
Writers from London, Ontario
Writers Guild of America Award winners